Three ships have been named HMS Norwich, after the city of Norwich:

 
 , broken up in 1771
 

Royal Navy ship names